Augustin Călin (born 1 August 1980) is a Romanian football manager.

Manager career
As a manager, Augustin Călin is known better in Africa where he coached several teams as: Naaba Kango, from Burkina Faso, Yeleen Olympique from Mali, US Chaouia, ES Collo, Ramdane Djamel or USM Blida from Algeria.

In Romania he managed only lower division teams as: Electroaparataj, Phoenix Ulmu or Comprest GIM. With the last one he won Liga IV-Bucharest in 2014. On 27 February 2017 he was signed as the manager of Liga II team, Balotești.

References

External links
Augustin Călin at Vice.com 

1980 births
Living people
People from Fundulea
Romanian football managers
US Chaouia managers
USM Blida managers
CS Balotești managers
Romanian expatriate football managers
Expatriate football managers in Burkina Faso
Romanian expatriate sportspeople in Burkina Faso
Expatriate football managers in Mali
Romanian expatriate sportspeople in Mali
Expatriate football managers in Algeria
Romanian expatriate sportspeople in Algeria